Cults in Our Midst: The Hidden Menace in Our Everyday Lives is a study of cults by Margaret Singer and Janja Lalich, Ph.D., with a foreword by Robert Jay Lifton.

Overview
Singer writes:
In this book I will use the term cult and cultic group to refer to any one of a large number of groups that have sprung up in our society and that are similar in the way that they originate, their power structure, and their governance. Cults range from the relatively benign to those that exercise extraordinary control over members' lives and use thought-reform processes to influence and control members. While the conduct of certain cults causes nonmembers to criticize them, the term cult is not in itself pejorative but simply descriptive. It denotes a group that forms around a person who claims to have a special mission or knowledge, which they will share with those who turn over most of their decision making to that self-appointed leader.

In 2003 a revised edition of the book titled Cults in Our Midst: The Continuing Fight Against Their Hidden Menace was published in paperback form by John Wiley & Sons, without Janja Lalich listed as co-author.

Publication history
The book was reprinted by Jossey-Bass in 1996 in hardcover format. A 1997 Spanish was issued as Las Sectas Entre Nosotros, and in German, as Sekten: Wie Menschen ihre Freiheit verlieren und wiedergewinnen können ("Sects: How people can lose and regain their freedom").

References 

1993 non-fiction books
Books about cults
Books about mind control
Books by Janja Lalich
Books by Margaret Singer